Union Sportive des Chaouia, , (In Tamazight: ⵜⵉⴷⵓⴽⵍⴰ ⵏ ⵉⵏⴰⴷⴰⵍⵏ ⵏ ⵉⵛⴰⵡⵉⵢⵏ), known as US Chaouia or simply USC for short, is an Algerian football club based in Oum El Bouaghi . The club was founded in 1936 and its colors are yellow and black. Their home stadium, Hassouna Zerdani Stadium, has a capacity of some 5,000 spectators. The club is currently playing in the Algerian Ligue 2.

On August 5, 2020, US Chaouia promoted to the Algerian Ligue 2.

Honours
Algerian Championnat National
Champion (1): 1994
Algerian Super Cup
Winner (1): 1994

Performance in CAF competitions
African Cup of Champions Clubs: 1 appearance
1995 – Second round

CAF Cup: 1 appearance
1994 – Quarter-Finals

References

External links
Team profile – The Biggest Football Archive of the World

Football clubs in Algeria
Association football clubs established in 1936
Oum El Bouaghi Province
1936 establishments in Algeria
Sports clubs in Algeria